ACIL Allen is an Australian economics and policy consulting firm, specialising in the use of applied economics and econometrics to analyse, develop and evaluate policy, strategy and programs. It is the result of the April 2013 merger between Allen Consulting Group and ACIL Tasman. ACIL Allen employs 65 consultants in offices in Sydney, Melbourne, Canberra, Brisbane, Perth and Adelaide.

Consulting topics and clients 

Since the merger in 2013, ACIL Allen now covers a wide range of industries and works across sectors that include agribusiness and natural resources, energy, government funded services and resources. Their clients are from both government and the private sector.

2021 
ACIL Allen was engaged by the Australian Department of Health to evaluate the performance of the second National Partnership on Essential Vaccines (NPEV) and identify achievements and limitations. The review will inform decisions regarding the treatment of the second NPEV upon its expiry. It considers whether policy objectives and outcomes and/or outputs of the second NPEV have been achieved and whether they have been delivered in an effective, efficient and appropriate manner.

In February, the Australian Energy Regulator (AER) released its draft Default Market Offer (DMO) retail electricity prices for public consultation. ACIL Allen developed the report, titled "Default Market Offer: Wholesale energy and environmental costs estimates for DMO 3 Draft determination".

ACIL Allen supported the AER in designing the forecasting approach for the wholesale and environmental cost components of the DMO.

On Friday 12 March, The Honourable Malcolm Turnbull AC, 29th Prime Minister of Australia joined ISA Chair Greg Combet to discuss the future of the super system and to launch a new independent report. Commissioned by Industry Super Australia and developed by ACIL Allen, the report - "Economic Impact of increasing the Super Guarantee Rate" - showed how an increase in the Super Guarantee will lead to a bigger economy, more jobs, higher real wages and higher real incomes for Australians.

A collective of Western Australian aged care providers engaged ACIL Allen in December 2020 to produce a detailed study quantifying the important economic and social impact of the Aged Care Sector to Western Australia’s economy and society more broadly. The report was launched at a Business News breakfast event in Perth on 28 May 2021.

ACIL Allen has on several occasions been engaged by the Commonwealth Department of Industry, Science, Energy and Resources to undertake emission projections for the electricity sector through to 2030 as part of Australia’s overall emission projections. These projections form part of Australia’s reporting obligations under the United Nations Framework Convention on Climate Change (UNFCCC).

2020 
In partnership with the Seedling Group, ACIL Allen led the project ‘Don’t judge, and listen: keys to breaking down drug and alcohol use stigma’, by appointment from the Queensland Mental Health Commission. The research explored the impact of stigma and discrimination related to problematic alcohol and other drug use on Aboriginal and Torres Strait Islander communities, families and individuals living in Queensland. The report to the Queensland Mental Health Commission was published in March 2020.  

In April 2020, ACIL Allen was commissioned by the University of Sydney to assess the economic contribution and impact the University has made to the national and state economies from 2006 to 2019.

In April and July 2020, ACIL Allen conducted a stocktake of drought resilience research, development, extension and adoption (RDE&A) knowledge for the Future Drought Fund. This work, on behalf of the Australian Department of Agriculture, Water and the Environment was to inform its future strategic investment in drought resilience RDE&A.

In 2020, ACIL Allen conducted an independent review into the functions, performance and efficiency of Meat and Livestock Australia.

In June 2020, the Port Hedland Industries Council (PHIC) announced the publication of a new report titled "The economic significance of the port of Port Hedland". The report was originally commissioned and produced in 2017 and titled "An economic study of the Port Hedland port". Since the findings in the 2017 report, the Port Hedland port has seen significant development, including increased activity in and around the port, elevating the economic value of the port to the region. The impact of the trade that is facilitated through the port to the local, state and national economies was so significant, it resulted in the PHIC, in conjunction with the Pilbara Ports Authority (PPA) once again engaging ACIL Allen to develop the new report that provided an assessment, and updated on the findings from the 2017 report. That report, as mentioned previously was titled "The economic significance of the port of Port Hedland" and was published in June 2020.

Since 2019, ACIL Allen has been engaged by the Australian Energy Regulator (AER), to apply the ACIL Allen methodology to estimate the wholesale energy costs for New South Wales, South Australia, and south-east Queensland. This is done as part of the AER’s determination of the Default Market Offer (DMO) which acts as a price cap for retail electricity prices.

ACIL Allen developed the methodology for setting the wholesale component of regulated retail electricity prices for the Queensland Competition Authority (QCA) in 2013. Since then (2013 – 2021), they have been regularly engaged to estimate the wholesale energy costs, as part of the Queensland Competition Authority’s (QCA’s) determination of regulated electricity prices for users in Queensland. ACIL Allen were engaged by the Australian Energy Regulator (AER) for support in updating the design of the forecasting approach for wholesale and environmental costs.

With increasing focus on hydrogen as an alternative energy source, ACIL Allen has been conducting research into its economic viability and the development of a National Hydrogen Strategy, since 2003. A number of reports have been produced on the back of this and further research that has been conducted. The most recent report was published in January 2020 and found renewable electrolysis to be the most expensive method of hydrogen production, when compared with other methods. ACIL Allen also prepared several of the reports and papers commissioned by the National Hydrogen Strategy Taskforce.

ACIL Allen’s Director Jerome Fahrer provided expert evidence on behalf of the claimants in the Robodebt class action in 2020.

2019 
Geoscience Australia commissioned ACIL Allen for an independent analysis quantifying the return on investment from selected Exploring for the Future (EFTF) projects that are representative of the nature of the work done under the program. The objective was to develop a plausible and economically robust estimate of the returns to government through increased government revenue as a result of the case study projects.

In 2019, ACIL Allen, in conjunction with GHD Advisory, produced the report "Hydrogen to support electricity systems" for the Department of Environment, Land, Water and Planning (DELWP).

Over several years, ACIL Allen has worked with Electranet in South Australia providing estimates around wholesale electricity prices. The most recent work, in 2019 updated earlier analysis (from 2018) of the impact Project EnergyConnect might have on wholesale electricity prices in South Australia.

2018 
In the 2018 South Australian state election, the Liberal Party was required to issue a retraction by the electoral commissioner after they misrepresented ACIL Allen modelling.

In August 2018, the report "Opportunities for Australia from Hydrogen Exports" was published. ARENA (Australian Renewable Energy Agency) commissioned ACIL Allen to produce the report.

2017 
In its bid to wins power at the March state election, the South Australian Liberal Party announced its intention to spend $200 million on fast-tracking a new electricity interconnector to NSW to bolster the fragile electricity grid. Economic modelling conducted by ACIL Allen Consulting showed the average household power bill would decline by up to $302 a year under the Liberal plan, by 2021-2022.

In 2017, the report "South Australian Green Hydrogen Study" was produced by ACIL Allen, for the SA Department of Premier and Cabinet (DPC), in conjunction with Advisian and Siemens.

2016 
In 2016, ACIL Allen conducted research for the Australian Automobile Association on transport infrastructure funding. The report that came from that research, called for a new funding model, with the research indicating that the federal government was likely to invest, "less than half the $81 billion in taxes it takes from motorists in new transport infrastructure over the next five years."

2015 
In 2015 ACIL Allen undertook a study on behalf of the property industry’s peak lobby, The Property Council of Australia. Analysis of the results determined that "Australia’s economy could be almost $40 billion better off if state and federal governments abolish a series of inefficient taxes, increase the GST rate to 12.5 per cent and broaden it to include fresh food, education and health."

2013 
ACIL Allen Senior Associate Vince Fitzgerald provided litigation support as an expert witness for the AGS  to support the government’s mandating of plain packaging for tobacco products.

2002 - 2012 
ACIL Tasman was criticised in newspaper The Australian in September 2012, with Tristan Edis saying that its predictions on renewable energy, fossil fuels and electricity markets were poor - although it "does have an excellent understanding of operating costs for existing large electricity generators in Australia". Edis noted that, at the time, large emitter lobby group the Australian Industry Greenhouse Network's last two chief executive officers were ACIL Tasman consultants and the organisations shared an office.

Pre 2002 
Prior to the merger in 2013, ACIL consulted extensively in the mid 1990's to Philip Morris and the Australian Tobacco Industry, preparing economic and public polling reports. Since then, ACIL Allen has worked with the AGS supporting the government’s case with the WTO against big tobacco on plain packaging.

Background 
The ACIL Consulting brand was established in the early 1980s. The Allen Consulting brand was established in the late 1980s by Geoff Allen, who prior to that was the foundation CEO of the Business Council of Australia. In March 1989 he was joined at Allen Consulting by Dr Vince FitzGerald, previously Secretary of the Australian Government’s Department of Employment Education and Training and Secretary of the Department of Trade.

In 2002 ACIL Consulting merged with Tasman Economics to create ACIL Tasman.

ACIL Allen was created in April 2013 as the result of a merger between ACIL Tasman and the Allen Consulting Group.

Tasman Institute 
The Tasman Institute was founded by Michael G. Porter in 1990 as a neoliberal think tank, based on his attempts in 1987 to found a private university and his earlier think tank, the Centre of Policy Studies. During the 1990s, it became one of the three largest neo-liberal think tanks in Australia. Through its consultancy arm, Tasman Asia-Pacific, it advised Asia-Pacific and Eastern European countries on privatisation and deregulation, in what academic Damien Cahill identifies as a rare example of a think tank "that puts neo-liberal theory into practice".

The Tasman Institute consulted for the Greiner government in 1991 on the privatisation of the Hunter Water Board.

With the libertarian think tank the Institute of Public Affairs, and funding from Victorian employer associations, the Tasman Institute prepared "Project Victoria" which proposed a neo-liberal program for the incoming Kennett government. The Tasman Institute was also awarded a government contract to consult on electricity privatisation in the state. Transport Minister Alan Brown would later describe the Tasman Institute as having a "profound effect" on government policy.

In 1995, the Tasman Institute and Tasman Asia-Pacific affiliated with the University of Melbourne.

Mergers 

In 2000, Tasman merged with the deregulation and privatisation consultancy London Economics (Australia), forming Tasman Economics. In 2002, Tasman Economics merged with ACIL Consulting, forming ACIL Tasman. Tasman Institute founder Porter became the executive chair. London Economics founder and Tasman Economics CEO Nick Morris became the CEO.

Nick Morris stepped down as CEO in October 2005 and left ACIL Tasman in February 2006, after he and ACIL Tasman senior consultant Jeffrey Rae were charged with recklessly or dishonestly failing to exercise their director's duties in good faith and for proper purpose.

ACIL Tasman 

ACIL Tasman merged with rival consultants Allen Consulting Group in 2013.

ACIL Consulting had operated for more than two decades covering key industries of energy, natural resources, agriculture and water.

References

Consulting firms of Australia